Xeryus is a men's eau de toilette manufactured by Givenchy.

The cologne was introduced in 1986 and comes in a spray bottle.

Its scent is a blend of citrus, violet, jasmine, spices, musk and amber.

A follow-up perfume Xeryus Rouge created by Firmenich was introduced in 1996.

See also
 Parfums Givenchy
 Perfume
 List of perfumes

References

External links
 Givenchy web site.

Perfumes
Products introduced in 1986